Jim Metzler (born June 23, 1951) is a retired American actor. During a career that spanned over three decades, he appeared in numerous films and television series. He was nominated for a Golden Globe Award for his supporting role in the film Tex (1982).

Filmography

Films
Squeeze Play! (1979) - Second base
Four Friends (1981) - Tom
Tex (1982) - Mason McCormick
River's Edge (1986) - Mr. Burkewaite
The Christmas Star (1986) - Stuart Jameson
Hot to Trot (1988) - Boyd Osborne
976-EVIL (1988) - Marty Palmer
Sundown: The Vampire in Retreat (1989) - David
Old Gringo (1989) - Ron
Circuitry Man (1990) - Danner
Delusion (1991) - George O'Brien
One False Move (1992) - Dud Cole
Waxwork II: Lost in Time (1992) - Roger
A Weekend with Barbara und Ingrid (1992) - Danny Shaffer
Gypsy Eyes (1992) - Harry Noble
Plughead Rewired: Circuitry Man II (1994) - Danner
Children of the Corn III: Urban Harvest (1995) - William Porter
Cadillac Ranch (1996) - Travis Crowley
L.A. Confidential (1997) - City Councilman
A Gun, a Car, a Blonde (1997) - Richard / Rick Stone
St. Patrick's Day (1997) - Adam
Phantom Town (1999) - Dad
The Big Brass Ring (1999) - Pacxy Barragan
Bad City Blues (1999) - Luther Logan
What Matters Most (2001) - Alex
The Doe Boy (2001) - Dr. Moore
What Matters Most (2001) - Reverend Worth
Megiddo: The Omega Code 2 (2001) - Breckenridge
Under the Influence (2002) - Geary
The United States of Leland (2003) - Cemetery Reporter
Wiener Dog Nationals (2013) - Mr. Fleet

Television
Princess Daisy (1983, TV Movie) - John
North and South, Books 1 & 2 (1985) - James Huntoon
Beauty and the Beast (1988-1989) - Steven Bass
Murder by Night (1989, TV movie) - Kevin Carlisle
Murder, She Wrote (1991) - Tom Benzinger
Diagnosis: Murder (1994) - Dr. Tom Harvey
Star Trek: Deep Space Nine (1995) - Chris Brynner
JAG (1996) - Commander Miller
Apollo 11 (1996, TV Movie) - Mike Collins
Sliders (1998) - Jonathan Griffin
Witness Protection (1999, TV Movie) - Jim Cutler
CSI: NY (2004) - Dr. Huff
NYPD Blue (2005) - Roger Harborn
Crossing Jordan (2007) - Judge Clarence Gordon
Amish Grace (2010, TV Movie) - County Sheriff
Glee (2011) - Minister

Video games
Silent Steel (1995) - Master Chief

Awards and nominations

References

External links

1951 births
Living people
American male film actors
American male television actors
Dartmouth College alumni
People from Oneonta, New York